Abdul Rashid Al-Hasan (born 14 April 1959) is a former field hockey player from Pakistan. He won the gold medal in the 1984 Summer Olympics.

References

External links
 

Pakistani male field hockey players
Medalists at the 1984 Summer Olympics
Olympic gold medalists for Pakistan
Olympic medalists in field hockey
Olympic field hockey players of Pakistan
Field hockey players at the 1984 Summer Olympics
1959 births
Living people
Asian Games medalists in field hockey
Asian Games gold medalists for Pakistan
Asian Games silver medalists for Pakistan
Medalists at the 1982 Asian Games
Medalists at the 1986 Asian Games
Field hockey players at the 1982 Asian Games
Field hockey players at the 1986 Asian Games
20th-century Pakistani people